The emblems of the autonomous republics of the Union of Soviet Socialist Republics are the heraldic symbols of the respective Autonomous Soviet Republic.

Prior to the approval of the Stalinist Constitution, which created many ASSRs, many ASSRs in that time had a distinctive emblem. The emblem of the ASSRs are usually round in shape. The emblem featured predominantly the hammer and sickle and the red star that symbolised communism. The USSR State motto, Workers of the world, unite!, in both the republic's language and some Russian was also placed on each one of them. In addition to those repetitive motifs, emblems of many Soviet republics also included features that were characteristic of their local landscapes, economies or cultures. All ASSRs emblems created during the korenizatsiya era usually included national patterns. The exception to this was the Bashkir ASSR, Crimean ASSR, and Moldavian ASSR, which used the emblem similar to their respective republics. A distinctive emblem was proposed in 1925, but it failed to gain official status.

After the approval of the constitution, many ASSRs changed their emblems according to their respective republic. The emblems of the ASSR were the same as the previous emblems, with only additions in inscription.

The table below presents versions of the renderings of the ASSRs' emblems prior to the approval of the Stalinist Constitution, as well as the arms of several ASSRs that ceased to exist before that time. For comparison, the arms of present-day successor states of the ASSRs are also shown.

All ASSRs ended the usage of their pre-Stalinist emblems in 1937. This is caused due to the fact that the Stalinist Constitution of the ASSRs were adopted in 1937, about one until three months after the adoption of the Stalinist Constitution of the USSR, which occurred in 5 December 1936.

Pre-Stalinist Emblems of the Autonomous Soviet Republics

Proposed Emblems

References

Citations

Bibliography

See also

 Emblems of the Soviet Republics
 Coats of arms of the Yugoslav Socialist Republics
 List of coats of arms of the Russian Federation

National symbols of the Soviet Union